The Premier's Cup is an Australian Turf Club  Group 3 Thoroughbred quality handicap horse race, for horses aged three years old and older, over a distance of 1,900 metres, held annually at Rosehill Racecourse, Sydney, Australia in August. Total prize money for the race is A$160,000.

History

Name
 1947–1988 - Rosehill Cup
 1989–1998 - Premier's Cup
 1999–2004 - Premier's Quality Cup
 2005 onwards - Premier's Cup

Distance
 1947–1951 - 1 miles  (~2400 metres)
 1952–1955 - 1 miles  (~2000 metres)
 1956 - 1 miles  (~1800 metres)
 1957–1971 - 1 miles  (~2000 metres)
 1972–1986 – 2,000 metres
 1987 - 1,900 metres
 1988 - 2,000 metres
 1989–2002 – 1,900 metres
 2003–2015 – 1,800 metres
 2016 onwards - 1,900 metres

Grade
 1947–1978 - Principal Race
 1979–2017 - Listed Race
 2018 onwards - Group III

Winners

 2021 - Harpo Marx
2020 - Mugatoo
2019 - Wu Gok
2018 - Avilius
2017 - Dee I Cee
2016 - Sense Of Occasion
2015 - Magic Hurricane
2014 - Greatwood
2013 - Less Is More
2012 - Glencadam Gold 
2011 - Break Card 
2010 - Snow Alert
2009 - Emperor Bonaparte
2008 - Red Lord 
2007 - †race not held 
2006 - Activation 
2005 - Railings 
2004 - Bush Honey 
2003 - Domine 
2002 - Gamesman 
2001 - Mulan Princess 
2000 - Super Revenir 
1999 - Catapult 
1998 - Joss Sticks 
1997 - Ask The Waiter 
1996 - ‡Meeting abandoned
1995 - Ardeed 
1994 - Century Reign  
1993 - O'Hara  
1992 - Donegal Mist   
1991 - Hammond 
1990 - Kessem 
1989 - Port Kingdom
1988 - Natural Habit
1987 - Northern Plain
1986 - Fix The Date
1985 - Colour Page
1984 - Just For Tristram 
1983 - Tulsa Knight
1982 - Bourbon Boy 
1981 - Coe 
1980 - Diamond Park
1979 - In Luck
1978 - Leonotis
1977 - Such Fun
1976 - Northbridge Lad
1975 - Americano
1974 - Broadway Hit
1973 - Drum Roll
1972 - Red God
1971 - Oncidon
1970 - Tails
1969 - Tails
1968 - By Gee
1967 - Tupaki
1966 - Victory Roll
1965 - Duo
1964 - Striking Force
1963 - Alpensea
1962 - Tamure
1961 - Gemstone
1960 - Boorala
1959 - Bardshah
1958 - Caranna
1957 - Turkestan
1956 - Regal Forest
1955 - Talisman
1954 - El Ziet 
1953 - Maynard
1952 - Hydrogen
1951 - Amused
1950 - Hurry Up
1949 - Dark Marne
1948 - Paktong
1947 - Courier 

† Not held because of outbreak of equine influenza 
‡ Meeting was abandoned due to weather

See also
 List of Australian Group races
 Group races

References

Horse races in Australia